Judson F. Williams Convention Center, better known as the El Paso Civic Center, is located on Santa Fe Street in downtown El Paso, Texas, adjacent to the Abraham Chavez Theatre. It was expanded in 2002 and now features  of columnless exhibit space (divided into three halls) with seating for up to 8,000 people. The convention center also has three lobbies totalling , including a  main lobby, plus  of meeting space. Trade shows and other special events also held at Williams Convention Center. The convention center is also home to the Sun Bowl Fan Fiesta.

References

External links
Williams Convention Center webpage at El Paso Convention and Visitors Bureau website

Convention centers in Texas
Buildings and structures in El Paso, Texas
Economy of El Paso, Texas
Tourist attractions in El Paso, Texas